Rotinoff Motors Ltd was a British commercial vehicle manufacturer based in Colnbrook in western London.

The company was founded in 1952 by the Belarusian émigré George Rotinoff. The Rotinoff company specialized in the production of ballast tractors and heavy transport vehicles. The vehicles of Rotinoff were widely used in Europe as tractors for tank transporters. In the Swiss army, the Rotinoff Atlantic GR 7 was used from 1958 - 1991 by the tank troops to haul Centurion tanks. More Rotinoff transporters were in use as road trains in Australia for the transport of cattle.

George Rotinoff died in 1959, and the brand name Rotinoff was then discontinued. Worldwide there are still Rotinoff vehicles in operation today and they are coveted collectibles.

Types

 Rotinoff Atlantic
 Rotinoff Super Atlantic 
 Rotinoff Viscount, cattle transporters (2 examples built)
 Rotinoff Pacific
 Rotinoff Atkinson

Locations of preserved vehicles
 Schweizerisches Militärmuseum Full
 Science Museum, London

Sources
 Data of the Rotinoff Super Atlantic on militärfahrzeuge.ch 
 Schweizerisches Militärmuseum Full: Werksammlung Mowag GmbH Kreuzlingen

External links 

 Video Rotinoff Atlantic
 Photo Rotinoff Atlantic
 flickr photo group on Rotinoff Trucks

Defunct motor vehicle manufacturers of England
Former defence companies of the United Kingdom
Companies based in Slough